Suoh may refer to:
Suwoh, a volcano
Suoh Tamaki, a fictional character in Japanese series Ouran High School Host Club